Amor Secreto may refer to:
 Amor Secreto (album), a 2002 album by Luis Fonsi
 Amor secreto (TV series), a Venezuelan telenovela